The 1918 United States Senate election in Maine was held on September 9, 1918. 

Incumbent Republican U.S. Senator Bert Fernald, who had been elected to fill the unexpired term of the late Senator Edwin C. Burleigh, was elected to a full term in his own right, defeating Democrat Elmer Newbert.

Republican primary

Candidates
Bert Fernald, incumbent Senator since 1916

Results
Senator Fernald was unopposed for re-nomination.

Democratic primary

Candidates
Elmer Newbert

Results
Newbert was unopposed for the Democratic nomination.

General election

Results

See also 
 1918 United States Senate elections

References

Maine
1918